Brignano may refer to:

Brignano Gera d'Adda, a comune in Lombardy, Italy
Brignano-Frascata, a comune in Piedmont, Italy
Brignano, a village frazione of Salerno, Italy
Enrico Brignano, an Italian actor